

Season summary
After Bayer AG withdrew their sponsorship, Uerdingen was reformed as Krefelder Fußball-Club Uerdingen 05. However, without Bayer's sponsorship the club struggled financially and they were ultimately relegated. As of 2016, this remains the club's last top-flight season.

First team squad
Squad at end of season

Left club during season

References

Notes

KFC Uerdingen 05 seasons
KFC Uerdingen 05